San Miguel was a 74-gun ship of the line of the Spanish Navy, launched in 1773.

She was captured by the Royal Navy in October 1782, during the Great Siege of Gibraltar and commissioned as the third rate HMS San Miguel.

A large number of RN ships and British Army units stationed at Gibraltar shared £30000 in bounty and prize money for the destruction of the Floating Batteries before Gibraltar on 13/14 September 1782 and the capture of the San Miguel on 11 October 1782.

She was sold out of the navy in 1791.

Notes

References

https://threedecks.org/index.php?display_type=show_ship&id=2751
Lavery, Brian (2003) The Ship of the Line - Volume 1: The development of the battlefleet 1650-1850. Conway Maritime Press. .

San Miguel (1773)
Ships of the line of the Royal Navy
1773 ships
Sieges of Gibraltar